Anania phaeopastalis is a moth in the family Crambidae. It was described by George Hampson in 1913. It is found in Cameroon, Djibouti, Eritrea, Kenya and Tanzania.

References

Moths described in 1913
Pyraustinae
Moths of Africa